Loïc Courteau (born 6 January 1964) is a French former tennis player. Courteau has coached the French Fed Cup team in years past, and has been the coach of Amélie Mauresmo, the winner of two Grand Slams, since 2002. He reached a career-high singles ranking of world No. 93 in April 1983. He won one double title in his career, in 1986 at Buenos Aires partnering Horst Skoff.

Career finals

Singles (1 loss)

Doubles (1 win, 5 losses)

External links
 
 

French male tennis players
French tennis coaches
Tennis players from Bordeaux
Tennis players from Paris
1964 births
Living people